StAR-related lipid transfer protein 4 (STARD4) is a soluble protein involved in cholesterol transport.  It can transfer up to 7 sterol molecules per minute between artificial membranes.

Function 
STARD4 may regulate cholesterol levels in many cells, including in the liver.  STARD4 has specifically been linked to the movement of cholesterol to the endoplasmic reticulum.  The protein is associated with the endoplasmic reticulum and lipid droplets.  Increases in the protein relate to cell stress.

High levels of STARD4 increases the synthesis of bile acids and cholesterol esters in liver hepatocytes. Reductions in cholesterol synthesis by cells increase STARD4 levels while StarD4 declines in mice fed a high cholesterol diet.

Increases in levels of either master gene regulator SREBP-1a or SREBP2, which both promote the production of proteins involved in cholesterol synthesis, increase StarD4 levels in mouse liver.  Conversely, increased STARD4 increases active SREBP2 levels.

Loss of the protein in mice has little effect.  Mice without functional STARD4 weigh less and females tend to have lower cholesterol profiles.  The most dramatic change observed to date is a reduction in NPC-1, a protein involved in bringing cholesterol into cells.

Structure
The protein is 205 amino acids long in the human (224 in the mouse) and almost entirely consists of a StAR-related transfer (START) domain.  It also lends its name to the subgroup of START domain proteins it is part of, StarD4.  This subfamily includes STARD5 and STARD6 and is closely related to the StarD1/D3 group.

References 

Genes on human chromosome 5
Water-soluble transporters